Abdus Sattar (5 June 1925 – 28 February 1991) was an Indian National Congress politician, seven-time MLA and cabinet minister in the state.

Early life
Abdus Sattar, son of Kalimuddin Biswas, was born at Lalgola in Murshidabad district on 5 June 1925. He did his post-graduation and degree in law from the University of Calcutta.

Political career
In 1965, he was leader of the Congress Party in the West Bengal Legislative Council. He won from the Lalgola (Vidhan Sabha constituency) in 1967, 1969, 1971, 1972, 1977, 1982 and 1987.

He was in the UDF ministries in 1969 and 1971. In 1972, he was minister for agriculture, law and minor irrigation in the Siddhartha Shankar Ray ministry. He was the leader of the opposition in the assembly from 1982 to 1991.

Death
He died on 28 February 1991. After his death, his son, Abu Hena, continued  to contest successfully the Lalgola seat.

References 

 

1925 births
1991 deaths
State cabinet ministers of West Bengal
West Bengal MLAs 1967–1969
West Bengal MLAs 1969–1971
West Bengal MLAs 1971–1972
West Bengal MLAs 1972–1977
West Bengal MLAs 1977–1982
West Bengal MLAs 1982–1987
West Bengal MLAs 1987–1991
People from Murshidabad district
Indian National Congress politicians
Leaders of the Opposition in West Bengal
20th-century Bengalis